The following is a list of Turkic scholars.

Pre-Ottoman era
The following is a non-comprehensive list of Central Asian scientists and engineers who lived from antiquity up until the Ottoman era.
Al-Farabi (872–950) (Al-Farabi, Pharabius), philosopher
 'Abd al-Hamīd ibn Turk (9th century), mathematician
 Ismail ibn Hammad al-Jawhari (940–1002), lexicographer
 Abu Bakr bin Yahya al-Suli (1005–1102), historian and chess theorist
 Mahmud al-Kashgari (1005–1102), scholar and lexicographer
 Yusuf Khass Hajib (11th century), author of Kutadgu Bilig
 Sibt ibn al-Jawzi (1185–1256), Islamic scholar and historian
Haji Bektash Veli (1209–1271), mystic and philosopher
 Baybars al-Mansuri (d.1325)
 Al-Dhahabi (1274–1348), historian
 Ulug Beg (1394–1449), mathematician and astronomer
 Ibn Taghribirdi (1411–1470), historian
 Ali-Shir Nava'i, poet, writer, politician, linguist, and painter
 Abu al-Ghazi Bahadur (1603–1663), historian and genealogist
 Babur

Ottoman era
The following is a non-comprehensive list of Ottoman scientists and engineers of Turkic descent who lived in the Ottoman Empire.
 Abbas Wasim Efendi (1689–1760), astronomer
 Ali Kuşçu (1403–1474), mathematician, astronomer and physicist
 Hezârfen Ahmed Çelebi (17th century), aviator
 İbrahim Hakkı Erzurumi (1703–1780), poet, author, astronomer, physicist, psychologist, sociologist
 Lagâri Hasan Çelebi (17th century), aviator
 Piri Reis (1465/70–1553), geographer, and cartographer
 Şerafeddin Sabuncuoğlu (1385–1468), surgeon and physician
 Qāḍī Zāda al-Rūmī (1364–1436), astronomer and mathematician
 Akshamsaddin (1389, Damascus – 16 February 1459), physician, religious scholar, poet
 Münejjim Bashi (early 17th century – 27 February 1702), Ottoman courtier, scholar, Sufi poet and historian
 Mirim Çelebi (16th century), astronomer, mathematician and physicist
 Kadrî of Pergamon (16th century), linguist
 Katip Çelebi (1609–1657), historian, geographer and bibliographer
 Seydi Ali Reis (1498–1563), Ottoman admiral and explorer
 Gelenbevi Ismail Efendi (1730–1790/1791), mathematician
 Evliya Çelebi, explorer
 Ali Çelebi, philosopher and moralist
 Mulla Shams ad-Din al-Fanari, Ottoman logician, theologian, Islamic legal scholar and lexicographer
 Aşıkpaşazade, historian
 Matrakçı Nasuh, polymath, mathematician, teacher, historian, geographer, cartographer, navigator, inventor, painter and miniaturist
 Ibrahim Muteferrika, diplomat, polymath, publisher, printer, courtier, economist, astronomer, historian, historiographer, Islamic scholar and theologian, sociologist
 Oruç Bey, historian
 Enveri, historian
 Ibn Kemal, historian
 Neşri, historian
 Şükrullah, historian
 Tursun Beg, historian
 Lütfi Pasha, historian
 Hoca Sadeddin Efendi, historian
 Mustafa Selaniki, historian
 İbrahim Peçevi, historian
 Solakzade Mehmed Hemdemi, historian
 Silahdar Findiklili Mehmed Agha, historian
 Osman Aga of Temesvar, historian
 Mustafa Naima, historian
 Ahmed Resmî Efendi, historian
 Ahi Çelebi
 Abdülaziz Efendi
 Imam Birgivi
 Dawūd al-Qayṣarī
 Kınalızâde Hasan Çelebi

See also
 List of Arab scientists and scholars
 List of pre-modern Iranian scientists and scholars
 Joint Administration of Turkic Arts and Culture

References

Scientists of the medieval Islamic world
Lists of scientists by nationality
Scientists
Medieval scholars